Babar Zaman Khan (born 16 September 1966) is a Pakistani former cricketer who played for Lahore and Pakistan International Airlines between 1985/86 and 1999/00.

Born in Rawalpindi, Khan belongs to an aristocrat Burki family.

References

Living people
1966 births
Pakistani cricketers
Lahore cricketers
Burki family
Pakistan International Airlines cricketers
People from Rawalpindi